The Territorial Force Imperial Service Badge was a short-lived decoration of the United Kingdom awarded to those members of the Territorial Force (TF) who were prepared to serve outside the United Kingdom in defence of the Empire, in the event of national emergency.
The conditions of enlistment for the TF laid down at their creation in 1908 did not allow for soldiers to be sent for service overseas against their will, as the TF was intended for home defence. However, any man could volunteer for the Imperial Service Section and serve abroad in times of war, which entitled him to wear this badge.

The badge was worn on the right breast of the uniform. It was not compulsory for the badge to be worn.

This badge became obsolete when the Territorial Force was elevated to become the Territorial Army.

See also
Territorial Force War Medal

References

Long and Meritorious Service Medals of Britain and the Commonwealth
Military awards and decorations of the United Kingdom